Lorna Ruth Dow (28 June 1926 – 1989) was an Australian cricketer. Dow played three Test matches for the Australia national women's cricket team.

References

1926 births
1989 deaths
Australia women Test cricketers